Lahaya is a Syrian village located in the Suran Subdistrict in Hama District. According to the Syria Central Bureau of Statistics (CBS), Lahaya had a population of 486 in the 2004 census.

References 

Populated places in Hama District